Janice Byung Min (born August 13, 1969) is an American media executive. She started her career in journalism, working at People magazine and InStyle, and was editor-in-chief at Us Weekly from 2002 to 2009. As an executive, she revamped entertainment industry publications The Hollywood Reporter and Billboard.

Early life
Janice Min, the youngest of three children, was born in Atlanta, to Nungsun Min, an IRS agent, and Hong Min, a zoology professor turned businessman. Her father taught at the University of Georgia and later became an executive for a medical supply company. Min's parents emigrated to the United States from Seoul, South Korea.

Min grew up mostly in Littleton, Colorado, where her family moved just before she started first grade. She excelled in school, skipping third grade and graduating high school at age 16. As a child, Min was a fan of journalist Connie Chung. Min said her parents were "oddly permissive" of her interest in journalism for Asian-American immigrants. Min also had an interest in fashion, ever since she was a little girl.

When Min was 13, she lied about her age, saying she was 14, to get a job at McDonald's. In middle school and at Heritage High School, she contributed to the schools' student newspapers. Min worked at a clothing store in a local mall, became a cashier at Target, and sold cosmetics at Foley's during a summer break in college. She interned one summer at MacNeil/Lehrer NewsHour.

Min moved to New York City to attend Columbia University when she was 16. There she met her future husband, Peter Sheehy, and graduated in 1990 with a degree in history. She also obtained a master's degree in journalism from the same university.

Career

Early work
Min began her journalism career in 1991 as a reporter for The Reporter-Dispatch in Westchester County, New York. She covered the crime beat, as well as local school board and planning committee meetings, among other topics.

Min joined People magazine in 1993 as a staff writer. She did not have an interest in celebrity gossip, but was looking for a job and had a friend that worked there. At first, Min struggled at People. According to one of her former coworkers, she was a "poor writer". Paula Chin, then-senior editor of the magazine, mentored her. Min became better suited for the position as People began to focus on lighter stories. She covered fashion for the "Style Watch" section, which became a regular weekly feature. Min was promoted to senior editor in 1997.

After five years at People, Min left the paper and briefly joined Life Magazine as the assistant managing editor. According to Adweek, she was "bored and miserable" at Life, because of the slower pace of a monthly publication. Min left in 1998, after less than a year at Life, to work for InStyle under the same job title. There she led the development of InStyle Weddings and InStyle Makeover. In 2001, Min quit InStyle and started looking for another position.

Us Weekly
In 2002, Min applied for the editor-in-chief position at Us Weekly and was instead hired as an executive editor under Bonnie Fuller, who became editor-in-chief. The following July, Fuller resigned and Min was appointed to take her place.

According to The New York Times, Min turned Us Weekly into one of the magazine industry's "major success stories". Public interest in celebrity news was growing, as was the magazine's circulation. In her role at Us Weekly, Min had a significant impact on popular culture and was influential in creating an industry for celebrity gossip. For example, Us Weekly was largely responsible for the popularity of the reality TV show about a couple with eight children, Jon & Kate Plus 8, after it featured John and Kate on the cover of eight sequential issues. Min focused much of the publication's editorial on reality TV stars, rather than actors and singers. According to Adweek, Min positioned celebrities as the reader's friend who "can take a little good-natured ribbing" and fostered more cooperative relationships with celebrities. According to Elle, Min depicted celebrities as people that "may make dumb, even craven, moves, but are never villains". According to The Los Angeles Times, Min "softened the tone and made it much more friendly to stars". Min also created a calmer environment in the workplace, which had previously been dramatic and contentious. Under Min's tenure, the publication's circulation grew from 800,000 copies per week in 2000 to 1.9 million by 2009.

Min had negotiated a contract that partially tied her compensation to the number of magazines sold. As distribution increased, her salary peaked at $2 million a year. She left in August 2009 as her contract was up for renewal and ad revenues at the publication were decreasing. For her work at Us Weekly, Min was named AdWeek magazine's Editor of the Year. While in-between jobs, Min received job offers from women's magazines, but was not interested. She spent ten months with her family.

Min was influential in creating an interest in celebrity pregnancies in popular culture through her work at Us Weekly. Shortly after she left, Min got a deal with St. James Press to write a book, How to Look Hot in a Minivan: A Real Woman's Guide to Losing Weight, Looking Great, and Dressing Chic in the Age of the Celebrity Mom. In August 2012, she wrote a column in The New York Times complaining about unrealistic weight and beauty expectations for new moms, set by celebrities. She was criticized in blogs and social media for criticizing an aspect of popular culture she helped establish. Min said the magazine was responding to reader interests, not creating them.

The Hollywood Reporter and Billboard
In December 2009, the CEO of Prometheus Global Media, Richard Beckman, acquired The Hollywood Reporter. According to The Daily Beast, The Hollywood Reporter was "in a death spiral". It had become too friendly to the celebrities it covered and was losing readership to competitor Daily Variety. After seeing in The New York Post that Min was moving to Los Angeles, Beckman began courting her to lead the publication's turnaround. She was named editorial director of The Hollywood Reporter in May 2010.

Four months after Min took the position, The Hollywood Reporter was re-launched as a weekly, glossy magazine. She focused the publication's editorial on in-depth feature stories and visuals. According to The New York Times, "she published 3,000-word profiles of and about Hollywood, plus plenty of juicy photo galleries and lighter items" as opposed to "quick blurbs about comings and goings". She avoided the re-written press releases and industry jargon that were common in prior issues. Some of the subjects upon which she focused included box office numbers, controversies, fashion and personal celebrity news. Min created art and photography departments and hired more journalists. The publication also began hosting Oscar and Emmy award parties for nominees.

Min led the modernization of the publication's website as well. The Hollywood Reporter web traffic increased 800 percent under her tenure at the publication and revenue increased 50 percent.

In January 2014, Min was promoted to co-president/chief creative officer of the Entertainment Group of Guggenheim Media. In this role she became the head of both The Hollywood Reporter and Billboard. Billboard was still considered the most reputable magazine in the music industry, but it was losing readers and writers due to a tumult in the music industry. Min was appointed to lead a similar turnaround as the one she facilitated at The Hollywood Reporter.

Quibi 
In 2018, Janice Min joined Quibi, Jeffrey Katzenberg's video startup business, to lead its daily news shows rubric called Daily Essentials. In September 2019, Min exited Quibi, ahead of its  April 2020 launch.

Ankler Media 

In 2021, Min collaborated with Richard Rushfield to launch Ankler Media, which expanded the Substack newsletter focused on entertainment news called The Ankler into a larger media business to include podcasts and events, also covering the entertainment business. Min currently serves as co-owner, CEO, and Editor in Chief of Ankler Media.

Min and Rushfield took part in an incubator program for this venture through Y Combinator to raise seed capital in June, 2022.</ref>

Personal life
Janice Min currently resides in Los Angeles, with her husband, Peter Sheehy, who is director of a nonprofit organization called KidUnity and a history teacher at Harvard-Westlake School. They have three children - Lila, Tate and Will. In 2019, it was reported that Min purchased an $8 million mansion located in Brentwood, Los Angeles. She previously bought two properties in the Pacific Palisades in 2010 and 2017 respectively.

See also
 The Hollywood Reporter
 Billboard

References

Further reading

External links 
 

1969 births
20th-century American non-fiction writers
20th-century American women writers
21st-century American non-fiction writers
21st-century American women writers
American entertainment industry businesspeople
American family and parenting writers
American magazine editors
American magazine staff writers
American newspaper reporters and correspondents
American people of South Korean descent
American women journalists
American writers of Korean descent
Columbia University Graduate School of Journalism alumni
Emmy Award winners
Living people
People from Littleton, Colorado
Journalists from Colorado
Journalists from New York City
The Hollywood Reporter people
Women in publishing
Writers from Atlanta
Writers from Colorado
Writers from New York City
Corporate executives
Women corporate executives
Women magazine editors
Columbia College (New York) alumni